Emil Cuello (born 2 January 1997) is an Argentine professional footballer who plays as an attacking midfielder for Phoenix Rising of the USL Championship.

Youth and college
Cuello played four-years of college soccer at Southern Methodist University between 2015 and 2018. During his time at SMU, Cuello made 73 appearances, scoring 12 goals and tallying 17 assists. In his freshman year at SMU, Cuello was named to the American Athletic Conference All-Rookie Team. His junior year, American Athletic Conference named Cuello Most Outstanding Offensive Player. His senior year, he was recognized as American Athletic Conference Tournament's Most Valuable Player and First Team All-American Athletic Conference.

While at college, Cuello also appeared for USL Premier Development League side Ocean City Nor'easters during their 2016 season.

Club career
On 11 January 2019, Cuello was drafted 19th overall in the 2019 MLS SuperDraft by LA Galaxy. On 27 February 2019, Cuello signed for the club. After two seasons in Los Angeles, Cuello's contract option was declined by the club on 30 November 2020.

On 20 January 2021, Cuello signed with USL Championship side San Antonio FC. On 25 August 2021, Cuello was loaned to fellow USL side Sacramento Republic, with Mitchell Taintor heading in the other direction in a swap deal.

On 15 December 2021, it was announced Cuello would join Sacramento Republic on a permanent basis ahead of the 2022 season. Following the 2022 season he was released by Sacramento.

Cuello signed with Phoenix Rising FC on February 2, 2023.

Personal life
Cuello was born in Buenos Aires, Argentina before his family moved to Orem, Utah when he was five-years old.

References

External links

 SMU profile
 
 
 

1997 births
Living people
Argentine emigrants to the United States
Argentine footballers
Footballers from Buenos Aires
Association football midfielders
SMU Mustangs men's soccer players
Ocean City Nor'easters players
LA Galaxy draft picks
LA Galaxy players
LA Galaxy II players
San Antonio FC players
Sacramento Republic FC players
Phoenix Rising FC players
Major League Soccer players
USL Championship players
USL League Two players
Argentine expatriate footballers
Expatriate soccer players in the United States
Argentine expatriate sportspeople in the United States